You Are Not Alone: Michael: Through a Brother's Eyes is a 2012 biography written by American recording artist Jermaine Jackson about his younger brother Michael. The book was first published by Touchstone on September 13, 2011. It is named after Michael's 1995 hit song.

Narrative
In the book, Jermaine offers a look into Michael's personal life from a young age until his death in 2009.

References

Works about Michael Jackson
2011 non-fiction books
American biographies
Touchstone Books books